Oberland, meaning "upper land", is one of the two electoral districts of Liechtenstein. It corresponds to the historic County of Vaduz, and the administrative seat is the city of Vaduz, the national capital. It has 15 seats in the Landtag.

Geography
The district, which includes the main towns of Vaduz and Schaan, is more populous than the Unterland and spans the southern portion, with between four-fifths and five-sixths of the country's land area. It is composed of 6 municipalities and 11 villages, for a total of 17 settlements.

See also
Unterland (electoral district)
Landtag of Liechtenstein
NUTS statistical regions of Liechtenstein
Lists of electoral districts by nation

References

External links

Electoral districts of Liechtenstein